Dilovası is a town and district of Kocaeli Province in the Marmara region of Turkey. It was ceded from Gebze district in 2008. The mayor is Cemil Yaman (AKP).

References

External links 
 District governor's site

Populated places in Kocaeli Province
Districts of Kocaeli Province